San Pablo Creek Marsh is a wetlands in Richmond, California on the city's western shoreline with San Pablo Bay and the Castro Cove estuary. The marsh is the delta of a small river San Pablo Creek which is the largest in western Contra Costa County, and is dammed at the midway point forming the San Pablo Reservoir. The area is home to several endangered species included the salt marsh harvest mouse and California clapper rail. It lies between Giant Marsh and Wildcat Marsh.

Notes

Geography of Richmond, California
Landforms of Contra Costa County, California
Islands of Northern California
Wetlands of the San Francisco Bay Area
Marshes of California